John Crawford (23 February 1880 – 1934) was a Scottish footballer who made 98 appearances in the Football League playing for Lincoln City and Nottingham Forest. Before moving to England he played for Renton. He played as a centre half or left half.

References

1880 births
1934 deaths
Scottish footballers
Association football wing halves
Renton F.C. players
Lincoln City F.C. players
Nottingham Forest F.C. players
English Football League players
Date of death missing
Place of death missing
Footballers from West Dunbartonshire
People from Renton, West Dunbartonshire